The Competition and Consumer Commission of Singapore (CCCS) is Singapore's competition regulator. It was first established as the Competition Commission of Singapore on 1 January 2005 as a statutory board under the Ministry of Trade and Industry, taking up its current name on 1 April 2018 to reflect its new role in consumer rights, a role previously under SPRING Singapore. CCCS enforces the Competition Act 2004, and has broad legal powers to investigate and penalize infringing parties. It now enforces the Consumer Protection (Fair Trading) Act, which protects consumers against unfair trade practices in Singapore.

References

External links 
 Competition and Consumer Commission of Singapore

Competition regulators
Consumer organisations in Singapore
Statutory boards of the Singapore Government
2018 establishments in Singapore
Government agencies established in 2018
Regulation in Singapore